Hrvatski nogometni klub Hajduk Split is a professional football club based in Split, Croatia, which plays in the Prva HNL. This chronological list comprises all those who have held the position of president of Hajduk Split from 1911, when the first president was appointed, to the present day.

The first president of Hajduk Split was Kruno Kolombatović, who was in charge from 1911 to 1912. Longest serving president in Hajduk's history was Tito Kirigin who spent ten years at the position. He was also the most successful president, with Hajduk winning nine trophies during his tenure: four Yugoslav First League championships and five Yugoslav Cup titles. The current president is Marin Brbić, who was appointed on 6 March 2019.

Hajduk had numerous presidents over the course of their history, some of which have been honorary presidents, here is a complete list of them:

Chairmen of the Board

1 Croatian First League was temporarily played during the 1940s, under the flags of Banate of Croatia, Independent State of Croatia and Socialist Republic of Croatia. Hajduk won a title in Banate of Croatia (1940), two in SR Croatia (1945, 1946) while refusing to participate in championships during Independent State of Croatia (1941–45).

Presidents of the Supervisory Committee

Presidents of the Hajduk General Assembly

Presidents of the Hajduk Sports Association
Active from 1948 to 1949

Presidents of the Hajduk Conference
Active from 1984 to 1988

References

External links
 List of Hajduk presidents at the Hajduk Split official website 

HNK Hajduk Split
Hajduk Split Presidents